(born August 6, 1961) is a Japanese composer, music arranger and record producer originating from Tokyo. Negishi began work as a synthesizer operator in 1983. He worked with IMAGIN, so he often arranged songs with Kohei Tanaka.

Compositions

Animation
Hyper Doll (1995, Pioneer LDC)
Lupin III: Twilight Gemini no Himitsu (1996, Nippon TV)
CardCaptor Sakura (1998, NHK)
Amazing Nurse Nanako (1999, Pioneer LDC)
Tokyo Mew Mew (2002, TV Tokyo)
Crash Gear Nitro (2003, TV Asahi)
The World of Narue (2003, Mainichi Broadcasting System)
F-Zero: Falcon Densetsu (2003, TV Tokyo)
Wagamama Fairy: Mirumo de Pon! Wandabo (2004, TV Tokyo)
Ghost Talker's Daydream (2004, Bandai Visual)
Strawberry 100% (2005, TV Asahi)
Cluster Edge (2005, TV Tokyo)
Tokyo Majin (2007, Animax)
Bakugan Battle Brawlers (2007, TV Tokyo)
Mnemosyne (2008, AT-X)
Bakugan Battle Brawlers: New Vestroia (2010, TV Tokyo)
Cardfight!! Vanguard (2011, TV Tokyo)
Bakugan Battle Brawlers: Gundalian Invaders (2011, TV Tokyo)
Cardfight!! Vanguard: Asia Circuit (2012, TV Tokyo)
Cardfight!! Vanguard: Link Joker (2013, TV Tokyo)
Gaist Crusher (with Kohei Tanaka) (2013, TV Tokyo)
Cardfight!! Vanguard: Legion Mate Chapter (2014, TV Tokyo)
Cardcaptor Sakura: Clear Card (2018, NHK)

Radio drama
Yamada Taro Monogatari (2001, Tokyo FM)
Troubleshooter Sheriffstars SS (2001, Tokyo FM)
Ghost Talker's Daydream (2001, Tokyo FM)
Trinity Blood: Rage Against the Moons (2001, Tokyo FM)
The World of Narue (2002, Tokyo FM)
7 Seeds (2003, Tokyo FM)
Angel Game (2003, Tokyo FM)

Video games
Bloody Roar (1997, Hudson Soft)
Hashi no Oka Gakuen Monogatari: Gakuen Sai (1998, MediaWorks)
Bloody Roar 2 (1999, Hudson Soft)
Sunrise Eiyuutan (1999, Dreamcast, Sunrise)
Bloody Roar 3 (2000, Hudson Soft)

Television drama
Kotobuki Wars (2004, CBC TV / Tokyo Broadcasting System Television)
Western Police Special (2004, TV Asahi)
Bishojo Celebrity Panchanne (2007, TV Tokyo)

Film
Lupin III: Dead or Alive (1996, Toho)
Partners (2010, Tokyo Theatres)

Arrangements
Mami Kingetsu - "Kyoe te Mr. Sky", "Yume wo Dakishimeru Teite", "SHOW TIME"
Mariko Nagai - Jokigen (1987), Genkyoho (1988), Tobikkiri (1988), Daisuki (1989), Miracle Girl (1989), Catch Ball (1990)
Hitomi Mieno - Ki Ra Ri Pi Ka Ri (1995), All Weather Girl (1995)
Yuko Imai - Disclose (1994)
Hiroko Moriguchi - Still Love You (1989, 4 tracks), Prime Privacy (1989, 8 tracks)
Yumiko Takahashi - "Egao no Maho"
Natsuki Okamoto - "Suru No? Shinai No"
Miho Nakayama - "Switch On"
Maki Mochida - "Kitto..."
Tomo Sakurai - "Boken no Kazu Dake"
Wu Rujun - "Niji"

Related pages
Imagine (music production)
Kohei Tanaka
Music arranger

References

External links
Imagine profile

1961 births
Anime composers
Japanese composers
Japanese male composers
Japanese music arrangers
Living people
Musicians from Tokyo